Phetchabun Airport  is an airport serving Phetchabun Province of northern Thailand.

Airlines and destinations

References

External links
 Phetchabun Airport, Dept of Civil Aviation
 
 
 

Airports in Thailand
Airports established in 2000